Meredith Brooke Kessler (born June 28, 1978) is an American professional triathlete from Columbus, Ohio who races in long distance, non-drafting triathlon events. She took third place at the 2011 ITU Long Distance Triathlon World Championships and has won numerous Ironman and half-Ironman distance races as both an amateur and a professional. She was named USA Triathlon's 2014 Non-Drafting Athlete of the Year.

Career
Kessler was born Meredith Keeran to parents Keith and Debbie and raised in Columbus, OH. Growing up she was a four-sport athlete playing field hockey, swimming, track, lacrosse and attending Columbus Academy. In 1996, after high school, she attended Syracuse University on a Division I athletic scholarship where she participated in field hockey and track. She graduated in 2000 with a degree in nutrition and hospitality management taking a job as a manager at the Ritz-Carlton Hotel Company in Half Moon Bay, California. It was also at this time she purchased a triathlon bike with her graduation money and jumped into Ironman racing. She later took a job in investment banking with RBC Capital Markets working 60 hours per week while still training 15 to 18 hours per week.

As an amateur, Kessler averaged four Ironman races a year on a loosely put together training schedule. In order to seek more structure with her training she sought out Matt Dixon as her coach in 2007. In 2009, she made the switch to become a professional triathlete, quitting her job at RBC. In her first race as a pro she placed 7th at Ironman Arizona. She would have three Ironman podium finishes in her first year as a pro, including a win at Ironman Canada 2010. The following year in 2011, Kessler dealt with hyponatremia and hypernatremia nutritional issues at the first two big races of her race season at Ironman St. George and Ironman Coeur d’Alene. However, she rebounded to take first place at Rev3 Portland, then took a third place podium spot at the ITU Long Distance World Championships in Henderson, NV, before rounding out the year with her fastest Ironman time ever, almost breaking the nine-hour barrier at Ironman Arizona.

As a professional, Kessler has since recorded over a dozen first-place finishes in long distance triathlon, including five consecutive wins at Ironman New Zealand, three consecutive Ironman Arizona wins, and three consecutive at Ironman 70.3 St. George.

Following her 9th Ironman race win at Ironman Arizona in November 2015, Kessler and coach Matt Dixon mutually parted with Dixon expressing admiration and respect for her.

Notable results
Kessler's race results include:

Personal
Kessler married husband Aaron in 2008. They were high school sweethearts and he was taught by her mother in first grade.

In March 2013, Kessler was driving her automobile and hit a pedestrian. She "briefly stopped and checked on the victim ... Then returned to her vehicle and drove off." In August 2013, she was charged with felony hit-and-run. The charges were later reduced to misdemeanor hit-and-run with Kessler entering an open plea agreement, admitting to hitting the plaintiff and leaving the scene of the accident. The sentence included 90 days of jail, three years of probation and restitution. Kessler and the pedestrian also settled in the civil court in March 2015; according to the pedestrian's attorney, the final settlement was $300,000.

References

External links

1978 births
Living people
American female triathletes
Syracuse University alumni
Sportspeople from Columbus, Ohio